Pakistan competed at the 1992 Summer Olympics in Barcelona, Spain.

Medalists

Competitors
The following is the list of number of competitors in the Games.

Results by event

Athletics

Men's 100m metres

 Arif Hussain
 Heat 3 round 1; 10.83 (→ did not advance)

Men's 200 metres

 Arif Hussain
 Heat 10 round 1; 21.75 (→ did not advance)

Men's 1,500 metres

 Nadir Khan
 Heat 2 round 1; 3:44.96 (→ did not advance)

Men's 400 metres hurdles

 Ghulam Abbas
 Heat 3 round 1; 50.57 (→ did not advance)

Men's triple jump

 Banaras Khan
 Qualifying heat 1; 15.37m (→ did not advance, finished 21st out of 21 in heat)

Boxing

Men's welterweight

 Khyber Shah
 Round 1; Lost to Mario Antonio Romero (NCA) on pts 7:2

Men's light middleweight

 Syed Abrar Hussain
 Round 1; Lost to Noureddine Meziane (ALG) on pts 7:0

Men's light heavyweight

 Mohammad Asghar
 Round 1; Walkover against Ali Kazemi (IRN)
 Round 2; Lost to Zoltán Béres (HUN) RSC in 1st rd

Men's lightweight

 Hussain Arshad
 Round 1; Lost to Henry Kungsi (PNG) on pts 13:9

Hockey

Men's Team Competition

Preliminary round Group B

 Defeated  (4-1)
 Defeated  (1-0)
 Defeated  (6-2)
 Defeated  (3-2)
 Defeated  (6-1)

Semifinals

Place 3rd-4th

 Defeated  (4-3)

Pakistan won the bronze medal
 
Team Roster
 Shahbaz Ahmed (captain)
 Wasim Feroz (vice-captain)
 Mansoor Ahmed (gk)
 Shahid Ali Khan (gk)
 Rana Mujahid
 Khalid Bashir
 Anjum Saeed
 Farhat Khan
 Khawaja Junaid
 Qamar Ibrahim
 Tahir Zaman
 Asif Bajawa
 Yasser H Khan
 Mohammad Akhlaq
 Mohammad Khalid Sr
 Musaddiq Hussain
 Mohammad Shahbaz

Wrestling Freestyle

Men's up to 57 kg

 Naseer Ahmed

 Elimination B 1st round; Lost to Keiji Okuyama (JPN) on pts 5:0
 Elimination B 2nd round; Lost to Alejandro Puerto Diaz (CUB) on pts 6:0

Yachting

470 Class

 Mamoon Sadiq and Javed Rasool
 Points 273.00 Net points 231.00 after seven races. Finished 36th out of 37

References

Official Olympic Reports
International Olympic Committee results database

Nations at the 1992 Summer Olympics
1992
1992 in Pakistani sport